Chickasaw County Courthouse mar refer to:

 Chickasaw County Courthouse (Iowa) on the National Register of Historic Places listings in Iowa
 Chickasaw County Courthouse (Mississippi) on the List of Mississippi Landmarks